Ophichthus rotundus is an eel in the family Ophichthidae (worm/snake eels). It was described by Chung-Lyul Lee and Hirotoshi Asano in 1997. It is a marine, temperate water-dwelling eel which is known from Korea, in the northwestern Pacific Ocean.

References

Fish described in 1997
rotundus